Heath Street station (also called Heath Street/VA Medical Center) is a Massachusetts Bay Transportation Authority (MBTA) Green Line light rail station in Boston, Massachusetts. It is the southwestern terminus of the Green Line E branch. It is located at the intersection of South Huntington Avenue and Heath Street on the border between the Mission Hill and Jamaica Plain neighborhoods.

History

Heath Street loop
A loop at Heath Street was constructed in 1945 to allow use of the new PCC streetcars, which only had an operator's cab at one end and could not use crossovers like the one at Francis Street to reverse direction. Route 57 (Francis Street–Park Street) was extended to the new loop on December 15, 1945, and began using PCC streetcars on January 3, 1946. Until 1961, service on Huntington Avenue consisted of a Heath Street– line and a – line. The Heath Street line was discontinued on September 11, 1961. Peak-hour service to the loop resumed on December 26, 1964; for a period in 1966, every other train on Huntington Avenue short-turned at the loop. Heath Street was the terminus of all weekday service (except nights) for three periods in 1977-78 due to streetcar shortages and track work.

In 1972, the MBTA began planning a reconstruction of the median-running section of the line, then scheduled for 1973–74. The work, including track replacement at the loop, eventually began in 1980 when the line was closed to modify the track and wires for the new LRVs. The line was cut back to Symphony on March 21, 1980; it was re-extended to Northeastern (using LRVs) on June 21 and Brigham Circle on September 20, but Heath Street and Arborway service did not resume until June 26, 1982. Heath Street short turns were cut on February 11, 1983 when a snowstorm closed the line, and did not resume when it reopened.

On September 8, 1984, short turns using LRVs were extended to Heath Street. On December 28, 1985, the entire Arborway line was cut for repairs to the Huntington Avenue subway. Service to Brigham Circle resumed on July 26, 1986, and to Heath Street on November 4, 1989; Arborway service was controversially never resumed. Around this time, a circular concrete shelter/crew base was built inside the loop.

2000s changes

In the early 2000s, the MBTA modified key surface stops with raised platforms for accessibility as part of the Light Rail Accessibility Program. Portable lifts were installed at Heath Street around 2000 as a temporary measure. The platform modifications – part of a $32 million modification of thirteen B, C, and E branch stations – were completed on January 13, 2003. The project included a wooden mini-high platform on the outer platform, allowing level boarding on older Type 7 LRVs.

As part of a series of service reductions due to a budget crisis, on July 1, 2012 the MBTA began terminating weekend service at Brigham Circle. The cutback was unpopular with local residents, who considered it an unnecessary inconvenience. On October 13, 2012, the cut was quietly reversed by reducing frequency on the branch slightly, thus allowing the same equipment to cover the full line at no additional cost. This was made official with the December 29, 2012 timetable.

In March 2011, the MBTA recommended stop changes to route 39 as part of the Key Routes Improvement Project. The outbound stops at Back of the Hill station and south of Heath Street were to be consolidated, and the inbound stop at Heath Street would be dropped due to its proximity to Back of the Hill. The outbound stop south of Heath Street was dropped in 2013, but the inbound stop was kept until June 21, 2020.

References

External links

MBTA – Heath Street
 Huntington Avenue entrance from Google Maps Street View
 Station from Heath Street from Google Maps Street View

Green Line (MBTA) stations
Railway stations in Boston
Railway stations in the United States opened in 1945